August Friedrich Karl Wilhelm, Duke of Saxe-Meiningen (Frankfurt, 19 November 1754 – Sonneberg, 21 July 1782), was a duke of Saxe-Meiningen.

Family
He was the first son of Anton Ulrich, Duke of Saxe-Meiningen and Charlotte Amalie of Hesse-Philippsthal.

Reign
August Friedrich succeeded his father in the duchy of Saxe-Meiningen (1763) when he was only eight years old. Because of this, his mother, the Dowager Duchess Charlotte Amalie, acted as regent during his minority, which ended in 1779. He was succeeded by his last younger surviving brother, Georg.

Marriage
In Gedern on 5 June 1780, Karl Wilhelm married Louise of Stolberg-Gedern. They had no children. The widowed Louise later married Duke Eugen of Württemberg and had issue.

Ancestry

References

1754 births
1782 deaths
Dukes of Saxe-Meiningen
People from Frankfurt
Princes of Saxe-Meiningen